Nigeria first participated in the Olympic Games in 1952, and has sent athletes to compete in every Summer Olympic Games since then, except for the boycotted 1976 Summer Olympics. The nation participated in the Winter Olympic Games in 2018, having qualified female athletes in bobsleigh and skeleton.

Nigerian athletes have won a total of 27 medals, mostly in athletics and boxing. The national football team won the gold medal in 1996. In 2008, following the International Olympic Committee's decision to strip the American 4 × 400 metre relay team of their medals after Antonio Pettigrew confessed to using performance-enhancing drugs, their Nigerian rivals were awarded the gold medal.
Nigeria also won a medal in the heavyweight division of taekwondo at the 1992 Summer Olympics; as this was only a demonstration sport, Emmanuel Oghenejobo's silver did not count as an official win.

The Nigeria Olympic Committee, the National Olympic Committee for Nigeria, was created in 1951.

Medal tables

Medals at the Summer Games

Medals by Winter Games

Medals by sport

List of medalists

See also
 List of flag bearers for Nigeria at the Olympics
 :Category:Olympic competitors for Nigeria
 Nigeria at the Paralympics

References

External links